Old Skool is an extended play (EP) by Dutch DJ and record producer Armin van Buuren. It was released on 4 August 2016 by Armada Music. Van Buuren said of the album, "What I miss sometimes in dance music is a little bit of the fun, the fun that we had by experimenting and going out of our way and doing strange things. And that's what I wanted to do with Old Skool".

Track listing

Charts

References

2016 albums
Armin van Buuren albums
Armada Music albums
Electronic dance music albums by Dutch artists